Mounir Zeghdoud (born 18 November 1970 in Constantine) is an Algerian former football player and a current manager.

International career
On November 26, 1995 Mounir Zeghdoud played for the first time against Ivory Coast in friendly match ended in a draw 0–0. Zaghdoud participated in the Africa Cup of Nations three times, the first was in 1998 and participated in all matches, Where was the Algerian national team eliminated from the group stage, The second in 2000 with manager Nacer Sandjak selecting Zeghdoud for his 22-man squad. where Algeria reached the quarter-finals but Zeghdoud did not participate in any match, The last African tournament Zeghdoud participated was in 2002 and eliminated from the group stage and Zeghdoud played only one game against Liberia, His last match with the national team was on July 3, 2004 in 2006 FIFA World Cup qualification against Nigeria which ended in a 1–0 loss.

Career statistics

Club

Managerial career
On March 3, 2020, Mounir Zeghdoud joined to USM Alger for one season after Billel Dziri resigned from his post. and although USM Alger announced that it would contract with a great coach for the new season, However Zeghdoud achieved good results as it stopped football in algeria due to the COVID-19 pandemic in Algeria. With the start of the season the club contracted with a new coach and they asked Zeghdoud to be an assistant which he refused  and said "I signed a contract until the end of the season. Now, if the management decides to hire a new coach for the next year, I will be forced to leave the club. I refuse the idea of taking the deputy position". On March 8, 2021, Zeghdoud returned to USM Alger and went with them until the end of the season after agreeing with Achour Djelloul club president.

Managerial statistics

Honours

As a player
 USM Alger
 Algerian Ligue Professionnelle 1 (3): 2001-02, 2002-03, 2004-05
 Algerian Cup (4): 1999, 2001, 2003, 2004

 JSM Béjaïa
 Algerian Cup (1): 2008

References

External links

1970 births
Living people
Algerian footballers
Algeria international footballers
1998 African Cup of Nations players
2000 African Cup of Nations players
2002 African Cup of Nations players
CS Constantine players
JSM Béjaïa players
USM Alger players
Algerian Ligue Professionnelle 1 players
Footballers from Constantine, Algeria
Association football defenders
Algerian football managers
USM Alger managers
CS Constantine managers
US Biskra managers
JSM Béjaïa managers
ASM Oran managers
RC Kouba managers
DRB Tadjenanet managers
Algerian Ligue Professionnelle 1 managers
21st-century Algerian people